Tondi railway station is a railway station in Tallinn, the capital of Estonia. It is located on the border of Tondi and Kitseküla subdistricts.

It is situated beside the level crossing of Tondi street, and is one of two places in Tallinn where the commuter train and tram stations are conjoined (the other is the terminus Balti jaam). The station is served by all commuter trains heading to Keila, Paldiski, Riisipere and Kloogaranna. It consists of two 167 metre platforms.

Although the Tallinn–Paldiski railway existed already in 1870, a station on the site was opened in 1933. The line from Tallinn to back then a nearby town Nõmme (as far as Pääsküla) was electrified already in 1924. In 1933 the tram line was drawn out to the new station building and a depot was built.

The station building was closed to the public in 1998 and remained in very bad condition. In 2006 it was declared a cultural heritage monument. In 2012 the old platforms were replaced with new lower ones. The upper wooden part of the station building was also demolished after several fires. Since the building was a cultural heritage monument, the elements of the building were charted and the plans of restoring it in the genuine appearance still remain.

It is planned to convert the level crossing into a railway viaduct in the future to reduce the traffic congestion during the rush hours.

See also
 List of railway stations in Estonia
 Rail transport in Estonia

References

External links

 Official website of Eesti Raudtee (EVR) – the national railway infrastructure company of Estonia  responsible for most of the Estonian railway network
 Official website of Elron – the national passenger train operating company of Estonia operating all domestic passenger train services

Railway stations in Estonia
Transport in Tallinn
Railway stations opened in 1933
1933 establishments in Estonia
Buildings and structures in Tallinn